Robert "Kinji" Shibuya (May 16, 1921 – May 3, 2010) was an American professional wrestler and actor.

Professional wrestling career
In 1952, promoter Al Karasick suggested Shibuya try professional wrestling. He was originally given a villainous gimmick of a Japanese bad guy after World War II. He wrestled in the United States and Canada's Stampede Wrestling and All-Star Wrestling. Shibuya credited Verne Gagne for first making him popular as a villain in 1955.

Shibuya was the frequent tag team partner of Mitsu Arakawa, who was billed as his cousin. In 1957, they held the Minneapolis version of the NWA World Tag Team Championship.

Personal life
Shibuya was born in Utah and raised in California with his four brothers. He attended Belmont High School in Los Angeles. He played football for the Los Angeles City College football team, and he also played football at the University of Hawaiʻi. After college, Shibuya played semi-professionally for the Honolulu Polar Bears and Honolulu Warriors.

Shibuya was featured on a "This is Your Life" segment on the television show Canvas Cavity and appeared on the show several times in the 1970s and 1980s. After retiring from wrestling, he also had small acting roles on shows such as Kung Fu and Mr. T and Tina. He also appeared in the films Days of a Bawdy Ballad and Hammett.

He was married for 59 years and had two children. Shibuya died on May 3, 2010, of natural causes. He was cremated, and his funeral service was held at a Buddhist temple.

Championships and accomplishments
Big Time Wrestling (San Francisco)
NWA United States Heavyweight Championship (San Francisco version) (3 times)
NWA World Tag Team Championship (San Francisco version) (5 times) - with Masa Saito (2), Great Mephisto (1), Great Sasaki (1), and Mitsu Arakawa (1)
Cauliflower Alley Club
Other honoree (1993)
Central States Wrestling
NWA Central States Heavyweight Championship (1 time)
Mid-Atlantic Championship Wrestling
NWA Southern Tag Team Championship (Mid-Atlantic version) (2 times) - with Mr. Moto
NWA All-Star Wrestling
NWA Canadian Tag Team Championship (Vancouver version) (4 times) - with Mitsu Arakawa (1), Sweet Daddy Siki (1), Don Leo Jonathan (1), and John Quinn (1)
NWA Pacific Coast Heavyweight Championship (Vancouver version) (1 time)
NWA Hollywood Wrestling
NWA Americas Heavyweight Championship (1 time)
NWA Americas Tag Team Championship (5 times) - with Masa Saito (3), Goliath (1), Killer Kowalski (1)
NWA "Beat the Champ" Television Championship (5 times)
NWA Minneapolis Wrestling and Boxing Club
NWA World Tag Team Championship (Minneapolis version) (1 time) - with Mitsu Arakawa
NWA Western States Sports
NWA North American Heavyweight Championship (Amarillo version) (1 time)
Stampede Wrestling
Stampede International Tag Team Championship (1 time) - with Mitsu Arakawa
World Class Championship Wrestling
NWA Texas Tag Team Championship (1 time) - with Duke Keomuka

References

External links

guy

1921 births
2010 deaths
20th-century professional wrestlers
American male professional wrestlers
Faux Japanese professional wrestlers
Hawaii Rainbow Warriors football players
American male actors of Japanese descent
Professional wrestlers from Utah
American sportspeople of Japanese descent
Stampede Wrestling alumni
NWA "Beat the Champ" Television Champions
Stampede Wrestling International Tag Team Champions
NWA Americas Tag Team Champions
NWA Americas Heavyweight Champions
Los Angeles City Cubs football players
Belmont High School (Los Angeles) alumni